The 2020–21 Rink Hockey European Female League is the 14th season of Europe's female club roller hockey tournament organised by World Skate Europe – Rink Hockey, and the 3rd season since it was renamed from CERH Women's European League to Rink Hockey European Female League.

Teams
Each national federation could enter up to four teams; however, an additional invitation was sent to spanish side Gijón Solimar, as they entered all previous editions of the competitions but failed to qualify after the season was shortened due to the COVID-19 pandemic.

Originally, a total of 14 teams from 4 associations was registered to enter the Rink Hockey European Female League. The 2018–19 edition finalists would enter the group phase, while the other teams would play a preliminary phase.

On 18 October 2020, the World Skate Europe-Rink Hockey Committee decided to postpone two preliminary phase matches due to travel restrictions imposed by the COVID-19 pandemic in Europe. Later that month, on 29 October, it was announced that all WSERHC international competitions would be suspended until the end of the year.

On 17 January 2021, an updated list of clubs interested in participating under new conditions was published, with all but the eight teams from two associations withdrawing from the competition. A new format was established for the 8 teams, consisting of a final eight played at a single venue over one-legged matches.

Final eight
The final eight was hosted by Palau de Plegamans, taking place at Pavelló Municipal Maria Víctor in Palau-solità i Plegamans, Spain from 27 to 30 May 2021.

Draw
The draw of the final eight was held 28 February 2021, 17:00 WET (UTC) at the Portuguese Roller Sports Federation headquarters in Lisbon. The eight teams were drawn without any restrictions.

Bracket

Quarter-finals

Semi-finals

Final

See also
 2020–21 Rink Hockey Euroleague
 2020–21 World Skate Europe Cup

References

External links
 
 zerozero.pt

Rink Hockey European Female League
Rink Hockey European Female League
Rink Hockey European Female League